Shivneri Fort (Marathi pronunciation: [ʃiʋneɾiː]) is a 17th-century military fortification located near Junnar in Pune district in Maharashtra, India. It is the birthplace of Chhatrapati Shivaji Maharaj, the emperor and founder of Hindavi Swarajya/Maratha Empire.

History
Shivneri got its name as it was under the possession of the Yadavas of Devagiri. This fort was mainly used to guard the old trading route from Desh to the port city of Kalyan. The place passed on to the Bahmani Sultanate after the weakening of Delhi Sultanate during the 15th century and it then passed on to the Ahmadnagar Sultanate in the 16th century. In 1595, a Maratha chief named Maloji Bhonsle, the grandfather of Shivaji Bhosale, was enabled by the Ahmadnagar Sultan, Bahadur Nizam Shah and he gave him Shivneri and Chakan. Shivaji Maharaj was born at the fort on 19 February 1630 (some accounts place it 1627), and spent his childhood there. Inside the fort is a small temple dedicated to  goddess Shivai Devi, after whom Shivaji was named. The English traveller Fraze visited the fort in 1673 and found it invincible. According to his accounts, the fort was well-stocked to feed thousand families for seven years. The fort came under the control of the British Rule in 1820 after the Third Anglo-Maratha War.

In 2021, it was added to the tentative list of the UNESCO World Heritage sites as part of "Serial Nomination of Maratha Military Architecture in Maharashtra".

Architecture
Shivneri Fort is a hill fort having a triangular shape and has its entrance from the South-west side of the hill. Apart from the main gate there is an entrance to the fort from side called locally as the chain gate, where in one has to hold chains to climb up to the fort gate. There are mud walls all around the fort. Inside the fort, the major buildings are the prayer hall, a tomb and a mosque. There is an overhanging where executions took place. There are many gates structures protecting this fort. Mana Daravaja is one of the many gates of the  fort. Its also called the origin of Tune.

At the centre of the fort is a water pond which is called 'Badami Talav', and to the south of this pond are statues of Jijabai and a young Shiva. In the fort there are two water springs, called Ganges and Yamuna, which have water throughout the year. Two kilometers away from this fort there are the Buddhist rock-cut caves, called Lenyadri caves, which is also one of Ashtavinayak temple in Maharashtra. It has been declared as a protected monument.

Access
The nearest town Junnar is a taluka place and is well connected by road. Junnar is about 90 km from Pune. The fort is at about 2–3 km from the junnar town. It is easy to reach the fort top via main entrance, however the trekkers with proper climbing equipment can try the chain route which is located on the western scarp of the fort. From the top of the fort, Narayangad, Hadsar, Chavand and Nimgiri forts can easily be seen.

See also
List of forts in Maharashtra

References

Further reading
 Dr. Lahu Kacharu Shivnerichi Jeevangatha, The life-story of fort shivneri, Sanay prakashan, Narayngaon, January 2015. p. 225.

 

 Junnar Tourism's official website
 Parashar Agritourism website

Buildings and structures of the Maratha Empire
Forts in Pune district